Air-Vice Marshal Harold Hawkins, CBE, AFC, ICD, GLM was an Australian air force officer who served as Commander of the Rhodesian Air Force from 1965 to 1968.

Early life 

Harold Hawkins was born in Toowoomba, Queensland, Australia in 1922. He died in South Africa on 13 March 1988.

Career 

Before the outbreak of the Second World War, Hawkins joined the Royal Australian Air Force. He saw service in North Africa, Italy, and the Philippines. During his service, he was posted to the Rhodesian Air Training Group's Central Flying School, Norton in 1943. A year later, in June 1944, he returned to Rhodesia to marry Evelyn Walker.

After serving in the Rhodesian Air Force, Hawkins was appointed as Diplomatic Representative in South Africa.

References 

1922 births
1988 deaths
Australian Commanders of the Order of the British Empire
Australian recipients of the Air Force Cross (United Kingdom)
Royal Australian Air Force air marshals
Rhodesian Air Force air marshals
Foreign volunteers in the Rhodesian Security Forces
Australian emigrants to Rhodesia